The Scottish Junior Football Association is affiliated to the Scottish Football Association and administers the Junior grade of association football in Scotland. The following is a list of Scottish Junior Football Association clubs, it does however include clubs which have moved to senior leagues and have remained SJFA members, allowing them to continue competing in the Scottish Junior Cup. Clubs that currently play in the Scottish Professional Football League are listed with a grey background.

Club names in bold are currently members of the Scottish Junior Football Association. Clubs in italics are currently in abeyance while in continued membership of the SJFA.

References

External links
 Scottish Junior FA
 All-time Scottish Football Club Directory 1829-2009, Brian McColl, via Scottish Football Historical Archive (archived version, 2015)

Clubs
 
Junior